Admiral Charles Ramsay Arbuthnot (5 February 1850 – 30 September 1913) was an officer of the British Royal Navy.

Biography
Arbuthnot was born in Liverpool, England, the son of George Clerk Arbuthnot (1803–1876) of Marisbank, Midlothian, (the third son of Sir William Arbuthnot, 1st Baronet), by his second wife Caroline Ramsay, daughter of James Hay of Collepriest, and Lady Mary Ramsay, the fourth daughter of George Ramsay, 6th Earl of Dalhousie.

Arbuthnot entered the Royal Navy as a cadet in September 1863, aged 13, and was commissioned as a sub-lieutenant in December 1869. He was promoted to the rank of lieutenant from the Royal Yacht  on 7 September 1871. In 1875–76 he served aboard the yacht  in the Arctic, earning the Arctic Medal.

Arbuthnot was promoted to the rank of commander on 31 December 1883, and to captain on 30 June 1891. In 1888 he was stationed in Zanzibar where he served in the Royal Navy's Anti-Slavery Squadron. From January 1896 until April 1898 he was in command of the protected cruiser , which formed part of the Flying Squadron of 1896, and then the battleship  between April 1898 and March 1900.

He was appointed a Naval Aide-de-Camp to King Edward VII on 9 September 1901, serving until promoted to the rank of rear-admiral on 1 January 1904.

In accordance with the provisions of the Order in Council of 8 December 1903, Arbuthnot was placed on the Retired List on 1 July 1907. He was promoted to vice-admiral on the Retired List on 22 March 1908, and to admiral on 18 September 1911. He died on 30 September 1913.

Personal life
On 8 January 1880 he married Emily Caroline, second daughter of Rear-Admiral Charles Frederick Schomberg. They had three children; Evelyn Mary (1881–1939), Beatrice Caroline (1883–1953), and Geoffrey Schomberg, (1885–1957).

Arbuthnot was a fellow of the Royal Geographical Society.

References

External links
 

1850 births
1913 deaths
Charles Ramsay Arbuthnot
Recipients of the Polar Medal
Fellows of the Royal Geographical Society
Royal Navy admirals